Anke Baier-Loef (née Baier; born 22 May 1972) is a German speed skater who competed in the 1992, 1994 and 1998 Winter Olympics.

She was born in Eisenach and is the wife of Arie Loef.

In 1992, she finished ninth in the 1000 metres event and tenth in the 500 metres competition.

Two years later she won the silver medal in the 1000 metres contest. In the 1500 metres event, she finished eleventh and in the 500 metres competition she finished 15th.

At the 1998 Games, she finished 15th in the 500 metres contest and 16th in the 1000 metres event.

External links
 

1972 births
German female speed skaters
Speed skaters at the 1992 Winter Olympics
Speed skaters at the 1994 Winter Olympics
Speed skaters at the 1998 Winter Olympics
Olympic speed skaters of Germany
Medalists at the 1994 Winter Olympics
Olympic medalists in speed skating
Olympic silver medalists for Germany
People from Eisenach
Living people
Sportspeople from Thuringia